= Carme Jordi =

Astronomer

Carme Jordi is a Catalan astronomer. She is a teacher in the Department of Astronomy and Meteorology at the University of Barcelona. She is a member of the Gaia science team, advising the European Space Agency on the scientific aspects of their missions.
